Veselin Petrović (6 September 1929 – 8 November 1995) was a Serbian cyclist.

Career
Veselin Petrović-Vesa was born 6 September 1929 in Vlasenica, Kingdom of Yugoslavia (today Bosnia and Herzegovina). He was a Yugoslavian (Serbian) champion cyclist. He moved to Capital city of Belgrade, Serbia during Second World War and started practicing cycling in his early teens. For 11 consecutive years he represented his country Yugoslavia at international cycling competitions. He was 6 times Yugoslav National Cycling Champion. In his career he won over 100 races and represented his country in 82 international competitions.

Petrović was the winner at the 1951 Tour de Macedonia and 1954 Tour de Yugoslavia. He was twice a Champion of Yugoslavia in road bicycle racing. He rode the road race in 1956 at the Melbourne Olympics and finished 26th and in 1960, at Rome Olympics Men's 100 kilometres Team, and finished 15th. He also rode Tour d'Algerie, Tour d'Egypt, Tour de Luxembourg, Course de la Paix (Warsaw-Berlin-Prague) also known as the 'Tour de France of the East' during the Cold War, and many more.

Petrović graduated with associate degree in Physical Education Teaching and Coaching from Faculty of Sports and Physical Education in Belgrade.

After he retired as a racer Veselin Petrović started a successful career as a directeur sportif (sporting director) of Tour de Yugoslavie and Tour de Serbie. He also served as the Director of Yugoslav Cycling Selection Committee, President of the Serbian Cycling Association, UCI  Official Representative for Yugoslavia and President of the Partizan Cycling Club in Belgrade.

Summer Olympic Games
1956 Summer Olympics Melbourne/Cycling
Men's Road Race, Individual, Finished 26th

1960 Summer Olympics Rome/Cycling
Men's 100 kilometres Team, Finished 15th

See also
Cycling at the 1956 Summer Olympics - Men's individual road race

References

External links
Sports Reference
Serbian Olympic Committee

1995 deaths
1929 births
Serbian male cyclists
Olympic cyclists of Yugoslavia
Cyclists at the 1956 Summer Olympics
Cyclists at the 1960 Summer Olympics